Wang is a musical (the sheet music indicates "comic opera") with music by Woolson Morse and book and lyrics by J. Cheever Goodwin. It was first produced in New York in 1891 by DeWolf Hopper and his company and featured Della Fox.

The show mixed comic opera material with burlesque and was set in Siam. The music does not have "Oriental" color, except for the title character's first entrance – on a "full scale imitation elephant" – and the wedding and coronation marches. The show was termed an "operatic burletta" because of the burlesque convention of having Fox wearing tights.

Production history
Wang premiered at the now-demolished Broadway Theatre, New York City, on May 4, 1891 and closed on October 3, 1891 after 151 performances. The cast featured Helen Beresford as Nannette, Della Fox as Mataya, DeWolf Hopper as Wang, Samuel Reed as Colonel Fracasse, Alfred Klein as Pepat, and Marion Singer as La Veuve Frimousse. A full-scale imitation elephant was built by Edward Siedle for Hopper to ride on during "The Man With an Elephant On His Hands."

The show was revived at the Lyric Theatre, running from April 18, 1904 through June 4, 1904, for 57 performances. The production was produced and directed by Sam S. Shubert and again starred Hopper and Singer, with Madge Lessing as Mataya.

Songs
The songs in Wang (according to the published music, which varies from the song list shown at the Internet Broadway Database listing for the 1891 production) are:

A Pretty Girl, A Summer Night – Mataya
Are Then The Vows –
Ask the Man in the Moon – Wang, Mataya and Colonel Fracasse
Baby, Baby, Dance My Darling Baby
Eminent Regent Wang – Wang and Chorus
Every Rose Must Have Its Thorn
If You Love Me As I Love You? (duet) – Wang and La Veuve Frimousse
Kissing Quartet
The Man With an Elephant On His Hands – Wang 
Mary! Mary! Why So Contrary? – Gillette and Girls
No Matter What Others May Say (trio)
To Be a Lone Widow – La Veuve Frimousse
Where Are You Going My Pretty Maid? (duet) – Mataya and Marie

The song "The Man with an Elephant on his Hands" was later adapted into an unlicensed and short-lived 1905 comic strip series by Everrett E. Lowry.

References

External links

Sheet music for A Pretty Girl, A Summer Night
Internet Broadway Database listing, 1891 production
Internet Broadway Database listing, 1904 production

1891 musicals